Club Deportivo Pan de Azúcar is a Panamanian football team playing in third level Copa Rommel Fernandez.

It was founded in 1974 and it is based in San Miguelito.

History
Pan de Azúcar participated a number of times in ANAPROF, achieving 2 fourth-place finishes in 1993 and 1994 and a third place in 1995 before relegating to Primera A (now Liga Nacional de Ascenso) in 1999. Pan de Azúcar had to wait until 2003 to promote to ANAPROF, becoming the first team in Panamanian football history to promote after previously being relegated. However the team were relegated once again in 2004.

In 2012–13, the team was relegated to amateur level known as Copa Rommel Fernandez.

In March 2014, it was reported long-time club president Adalberto Agámez died. He had led the club during their most successful period in the 1990s, finishing twice in 4th place of the ANAPROF competition. The club however responded on Twitter that the reports were false and that Agámez was still alive. Former player Juan Serrano however was killed in March 2014.

Players

1. Miguel Trujillo (GK)

22. Miguel Corella (GK)

17. Romario Flores (CB) (C)

28. Virgil Paterson (CB)

19. Jonathan "Carroso" Gil (LB)

3. Amaury Meza (CF)

6. Trey Quintero (CM)

9. Guillermo "Isco" Enrique (CF)

Honours
Liga Nacional de Ascenso: 0
Runner-up (3): 2000, 2003, 2006

References

External links
Pan de Azucar's Blog

Association football clubs established in 1974
Football clubs in Panama
1974 establishments in Panama